Maybole Juniors Football Club are a Scottish football club based in the town of Maybole, Ayrshire. The team has been managed since December 2014 by Carlo Walker.

Current squad

(Vice-Captain)

Honours
Ayrshire District League winners:  2003–04, 2011–12  
Kyle & Carrick Cup: 1991–92, 1993–94 
South Ayrshire Cup: 1995–96, 2001–02 
 Vernon Trophy - 1962–63
 South Ayrshire Cup - 1995–96, 2001–02

References

External links
Official club website

Football clubs in Scotland
Scottish Junior Football Association clubs
Football in South Ayrshire
Association football clubs established in 1946
1946 establishments in Scotland
West of Scotland Football League teams
Maybole